Lawrence “Law” Roach is a retired American fashion stylist best known for his work with Zendaya and for serving as a judge on Legendary.

Career 
Roach's styling debut was in a Deliciously Vintage boutique, when Kanye West walked into the store in 2009.

For the 2021 Met Gala, Roach had the opportunity to style 10 celebrities, some include Alton Mason, Kehlani, and Hunter Schafer.

He starred as a permanent judge on the HBO Max show Legendary alongside Megan Thee Stallion, Keke Palmer, Leiomy Maldonado, and Jameela Jamil.

As a stylist, some of his most well known clients are Celine Dion, Zendaya, Tom Holland, and Ariana Grande. In 2016, Roach was announced as one of the judges for cycle 23 of America’s Next Top Model, alongside Ashley Graham , Rita Ora and Drew Elliott. The following year, he then partnered with Celine Dion to style her for Couture Week in Paris and became the first African American stylist to cover the annual The Hollywood Reporter’s Stylist & Stars issue. Dion and Zendaya joined Roach for the cover.

He received the 2021 Gem Award for Jewelry Style. 
He received the inaugural stylist award for American Fashion at the 2022 CFDA Awards in New York.

Roach announced his retirement from styling via Instagram in March 2023, stating that “if this business was just about clothes I would do it for the rest of my life but unfortunately it’s not! The politics , the lies and false narratives finally got me! You win … I’m out.”(sic) However, Roach later clarified that he would still be working with Zendaya, stating that “So y’all really think I’m breaking up with Z….. we are forever!” and “She’s my little sister and it’s real love not the fake industry love.”(sic)

In his March 17, 2023 interview with The Cut, Roach cited burnout and a desire to live a happier life as reasons for his retirement. Roach discussed the challenges he faces in the industry, including “false narratives perpetuated by gatekeepers and intermediaries”. He expressed frustration at the loss of clients due to these aforementioned narratives, which “are often untrue”. Roach additionally emphasized his love for fashion and his commitment to protecting his clients, but also expressed a desire to be better taken care of in return.

Personal life
Roach is openly gay.

Through a series of Instagram stories in 2021, Roach revealed the death of his three-year old nephew. According to the Chicago Police Department Office of Communications, Law's nephew died on Tuesday, Nov. 23, 2021, about 10:40 p.m. local time, after falling out of a window on the 17th story of a Chicago building with the screen drawn inward.

Filmography

References 

Year of birth missing (living people)
Living people
American LGBT broadcasters
American fashion businesspeople
Fashion stylists
LGBT African Americans
Gay men
Participants in American reality television series